The nail violin is a musical instrument which was invented by German violinist Johann Wilde in 1740.

History
Wilde was inspired to create the instrument when he accidentally drew his bow across a metal peg, which produced a musical sound. The bow used was fitted with coarse black horsehair, which produced sound by friction. An improved instrument, now in the collection of the Hochschule in Berlin, has two half-moon sound-chests of different sizes, one on the top of the other, forming terraces. In the rounded wall of the upper sound-chest are two rows of iron staples, the upper giving the diatonic scale, and the lower the intermediate chromatic semitones. The instrument has a sweet bell-like tone but limited technical possibilities.

History records the name of a single virtuoso on this instrument; he was a Bohemian musician called Senal, who travelled all over Germany with his instrument about 1780–1790. Senal had modified the instrument by adding sympathetic strings, and dubbed this enhanced version the "violino harmonico".

There have been several other modifications or variations on Wilde's original design. Modifications include the use of glass or wooden rods instead of metal nails. Träger of Bernberg (Saxony) created a treadle-operated keyboard version in 1791. The Adiaphonon, created by Franz Schuster in 1818-1819, was similar to the nail violin. It used bowed steel rods and had a six octave range. Its range was F1-F7. A Nineteenth Century modification, called the Stockspiel or Melkharmonica, incorporated wooden rods, which were played using rosined gloves. Bill Wesley has invented the Array Nail Violin, in which the notes are arranged according to the Array system. It is played with the fingers, thumbs, and palms dusted with dancer's rosin.  The waterphone works on similar principles, but is atonal rather than chromatic, and has water in its resonator.

Musical instrument classification
The instrument is categorized as a friction idiophone, as it is played by bowing. The instrument can also be played by striking the nails or rods. Michael Meadows has made contemporary copies of the early design of the instrument.

See also
 Daxophone
 Sensitive style

Notes

References

Attribution

External links
Edward Heron-Allen/Hugh Davies: 'Nail violin', Grove Music Online  ed. L. Macy (Accessed 3 April 2008)
A nail violin' at YouTube.

Sets of friction sticks
Bowed instruments
1740 introductions